Governor Blanco may refer to:

Kathleen Blanco (1942–2019), Governor of Louisiana
Ramón Blanco, 1st Marquess of Peña Plata (1833–1906), 109th Governor General of the Philippines from 1893 to 1896 and Governor of Cuba from 1879 to 1881
Víctor Blanco (governor) (fl. 1820s–1840s), 4th Governor of Coahuila y Tejas from 1826 to 1827